Matorral is a Spanish word, along with tomillares, for shrubland, thicket or bushes. It is used in naming and describing a Mediterranean climate ecosystem in Southern Europe.

Mediterranean region 
Matorral originally referred to the Matorral shrublands and woodlands in the Mediterranean climate regions of Spain and other Mediterranean Basin countries. These scrub shrublands and woodlands are a plant community and a distinct habitat. Other common general names for this Mediterranean region shrubland habitat ecosystem are: in France as Maquis and Garrigue; in  Italy as Macchia Mediterranea; in Greece as Phrygana; in Portugal as Mato; and in Israel as Batha. Now the term is used more broadly to include similar bio-assemblages where ever they occur.

In Portugal, the term mato or matagal is used to refer to the scrublands, or heaths, that formed on the Cambrian and Silurian schists in the north and central parts of Portugal.

Mediterranean Matorral shrublands are often part of a mosaic landscape, interspersed with forests, woodlands, grassland, and scrublands.

The Americas
The term matorral followed Spanish colonization of the Americas, and is used to refer to both Mediterranean (climate)  woodlands and scrub, and xeric shrublands ecosystems in Mexico, Chile, and elsewhere.

There are Chilean Matorral areas in central Chile, including portions of La Campana National Park.

The Central Mexican matorral, Meseta Central matorral, Tamaulipan matorral, and Tehuacán Valley matorral are xeric shrubland ecoregions of Mexico.

The Portuguese term mato was imported to colonial eastern South America, where it was used to refer to the great scrublands, savannas, and flooded grasslands region called the Mato Grosso, in present-day western Brazil.

Popular usage 
The regional Mexican band Los Tigres Del Norte used the term matorrales, the plural form of matorral, in their now-famous song "Pacas De A Kilo," an example of the infamous narco-corridos or drug ballads.

See also
Maquis shrubland
Index: Mediterranean forests, woodlands, and scrub

References

 01
Environment of the Mediterranean
Mediterranean forests, woodlands, and scrub
Deserts and xeric shrublands
Ecoregions of Europe
Ecoregions of Italy
Ecoregions of Spain

Palearctic ecoregions